Mission San Pedro y San Pablo de Bicuñer was founded on January 7, 1781, by Spanish Padre Francisco Garcés, to protect the Anza Trail where it forded the Colorado River, between the Mexican provinces of Alta California and New Navarre.

History
The Mission site and nearby pueblo were inadequately supported, and Spanish colonists seized the best lands, destroyed the Indians' crops, and generally ignored the rights of the local natives.

In retaliation, the Quechans (Yuma) and their allies attacked and destroyed the installation and the neighboring Mission Puerto de Purísima Concepción during a three-day period, from July 17–19, 1781. Some 50 Spaniards, including Father Garcés (along with three other friars and Captain Fernando Rivera y Moncada) were killed, and the women and children taken captive. The Indians' victory closed this crossing and seriously crippled future communications between Las Californias province and colonial Mexico, both within the Viceroyalty of New Spain.

Today, only a California Historical Marker identifies the site. The marker is located on Imperial County Road S24, 0.2 mi W of the intersection of Levee Road and Mehring Road/11th St, and 4.4 mi NE of Bard, in southeastern Imperial County.

California Historical Landmark
California Historical Landmark number 921 reads:

NO. 921 SITE OF MISSION SAN PEDRO Y SAN PABLO DE BICUNER – To protect the Anza Trail where it forded the Colorado River, the Spanish founded a pueblo and mission nearby on January 7, 1781. Threatened with the loss of their land, the Quechans (Yumas) attacked this strategic settlement on July 17, 1781. The Quechan victory closed this crossing and seriously crippled future communications between upper California and Mexico.

See also
 Spanish missions in Arizona
 
 California Historical Landmarks in Imperial County
 Spanish missions in the Sonoran Desert
 Spanish missions in Baja California
 California Historical Landmark

References

External links
 Missions of the Colorado River
 Discovery of California
 Virtual Tour of California Missions
 California State Landmark number 921 plaque

San Pedro y San Pablo de Bicu
San Pedro y San Pablo de Bicu
California Historical Landmarks
Pre-statehood history of Arizona
1781 establishments in New Spain
1781 establishments in Alta California
National Register of Historic Places in Imperial County, California
Churches on the National Register of Historic Places in California